Dianna is a female given name. Originally an alternative spelling of the form Diana with two Ns, meaning "heavenly, divine".

People with this name include:
 Dianna Agron (born 1986), American actress, singer, and dancer
 Dianna Booher, American author,[1] and communication expert
 Dianna Clark, American sport fisher
 Dianna Corcoran (born 1979), Australian country music singer-songwriter
 Dianna Dilworth (born 1978), American filmmaker and journalist
 Dianna Duran (born 1956), American politician
 Dianna Fuller Morgan, American businesswoman
 Dianna Gwilliams (born 1957), American-born official in the Church of England
 Dianna Ley (born 1984), Australian Paralympic swimmer
 Dianna Melrose (born 1952), Zimbabwe-born British diplomat
 Dianna Ortiz (1958–2021), American Catholic nun
 Dianna Russini  (born 1983), American sports journalist
 DiAnna Schimek (born 1940), American politician
 Dianna Xu, American mathematician and computer scientist